Stylophora pistillata, commonly known as hood coral or smooth cauliflower coral, is a species of stony coral in the family Pocilloporidae. It is native to the Indo-Pacific region and is commonly used in scientific investigations.

Description
Stylophora pistillata has broad, blunt-ended branches, and colonies become thicker and more submassive as they grow. The corallites (stony cups from which the polyps emerge) are conical or hooded and are sunk beneath the general surface. The columella (central column of the corallite) is solid and  prominent, and the septa (stony plates forming the corallite wall) may be fused to the columella. There are six primary septa and sometimes six secondary ones. Colonies can be cream, pink, bluish or green.

Distribution
Stylophora pistillata is widely distributed in the tropical and subtropical Indo-Pacific region. Its range extends from Madagascar, East Africa, the Red Sea and the Persian Gulf, through the Indian Ocean to northern Australia, Indonesia, the Philippines, New Guinea, Japan and many island groups in the western and central Pacific Ocean. It is a reef-building species and favours exposed habitats with strong water movement.

Ecology
This coral provides a home to gall crabs, Trapezia crabs, boring clams, date mussels, barnacles, Christmas tree worms and damselfish. Some, such as the date mussels, are parasites that bore into the coral structure and weaken the coral skeleton. However, boring clams bring fresh, oxygenated water into the colony which benefits the coral.

Status
The chief threats faced by corals in general are climate change, with its associated sea temperature rise and increase in violent storms, and habitat destruction, as well as an increase in ocean acidification and an increasing susceptibility to coral diseases. Stylophora pistillata is prone to coral bleaching, a condition in which corals force out the beneficial zooxanthellae from their tissues and become white and liable to die. However, this is a common species of coral with a wide distribution and may be more resilient than some less widespread coral species. It is collected for the reef aquarium trade, with about 10,000 pieces being exported in 2005. The International Union for Conservation of Nature has assessed its conservation status as being "near threatened".

References

External links
 

Pocilloporidae
Corals described in 1797
Cnidarians of the Indian Ocean
Cnidarians of the Pacific Ocean
Taxa named by Eugenius Johann Christoph Esper